Enlil-Nasir II was the king of Assyria from  1430 BC to 1425 BC. The brother of Ashur-nadin-ahhe I, he seized the throne in a successful coup.

References

15th-century BC Assyrian kings
Leaders who took power by coup
Year of birth unknown

Year of death unknown